Seth Hembram is an Indian politician. He was elected to the Lok Sabha, lower house of the Parliament of India from Rajmahal, Bihar as a member of the Indian National Congress.

References

Living people
Santali people
Indian National Congress politicians
Lok Sabha members from Bihar
India MPs 1980–1984
India MPs 1984–1989
Year of birth missing (living people)